Amade is both a given name and a surname. Notable people with the name include:

Given named
Amade Aba (died 1311), Hungarian noble
Amade Camal (born 1956), Mozambican politician and entrepreneur

Wolfgang Amadè Mozart (1756–1791; aka "Mozart"), Austrian Classical composer

Surnamed
Andre Amade (born 1983), Brazilian mixed martial artist

See also

Amadea (disambiguation)
Amadee (disambiguation)
Amadeo (disambiguation)
Amadeus (disambiguation)
Amédée (disambiguation)
Amedeo (disambiguation)
 
 Ahmad (disambiguation)